Carey Lowell (born February 11, 1961) is an American actress and former model, best known as ADA Jamie Ross in Law & Order (1996–2001, 2022) and as Bond girl Pam Bouvier in the James Bond movie Licence to Kill (1989).

Early life
Lowell was born in Huntington, New York, the daughter of  geologist James Lowell. She spent her childhood living in several countries, including Libya, the Netherlands, and France. In the US she also lived in Houston, Texas, and Denver, Colorado, where her family settled when she was 12.  After a year at the University of Colorado at Boulder, where she considered majoring in literature, she moved to New York City to pursue modeling, and worked for such clients as Ralph Lauren and Calvin Klein, and at one point attended New York University. She also studied at Manhattan's Neighborhood Playhouse School of the Theatre.

Career
Lowell broke into acting with the film Dangerously Close followed by a small role in the Robin Williams movie Club Paradise. She went on to roles including co-starring as Bond girl Pam Bouvier in the James Bond movie Licence to Kill (1989) and, starting in 1996, as Assistant District Attorney Jamie Ross for two seasons on the television drama Law & Order, a character she reprised in 2005 for a guest role on its spinoff, Law & Order: Trial by Jury, and again on the original series in 2022 when it returned for a 21st season. Immediately before getting that role, however, she had become frustrated with her acting career and had applied to study documentary filmmaking at New York University.

She took a hiatus from acting during the mid-2000s. In 2012, Lowell lent her likeness and voice while reprising her Licence to Kill role in the video game 007 Legends.  In 2018 she returned to TV, appearing as a guest on the show Blue Bloods.

Personal life
Lowell has been married three times. Her first husband was fashion photographer John Stember, to whom she was married from 1984 to 1988.

She was married to actor Griffin Dunne from 1989 to 1995 and has a daughter, Hannah, from the marriage. 

Lowell married actor Richard Gere in November 2002, following the birth of their child Homer James Jigme Gere, who was born in February 2000. In September 2013, the two separated after 11 years of marriage. The couple spent three years in highly contested divorce proceedings in New York Supreme Court. The case was settled in October 2016.

Filmography

Film

Television

References

External links

 
 
 

1961 births
20th-century American actresses
21st-century American actresses
Actresses from New York (state)
American female models
American film actresses
American television actresses
American voice actresses
Living people
Neighborhood Playhouse School of the Theatre alumni
New York University alumni
People from Huntington, New York
University of Colorado Boulder alumni